Taste receptor type 2 member 4 is a protein that in humans is encoded by the TAS2R4 gene.

Function 

This gene encodes a member of a family of candidate taste receptors that are members of the G protein-coupled receptor superfamily and that are specifically expressed by taste receptor cells of the tongue and palate epithelia. These apparently intronless genes encode a 7-transmembrane receptor protein, functioning as a bitter taste receptor. This gene is clustered with another 3 candidate taste receptor genes in chromosome 7 and is genetically linked to loci that influence bitter perception. The geographic distribution of TAS2R4 and TAS2R5 missense allele variants which prevent expression of the receptors is aligned with the distributions of tannin sorghum and the  destructive agricultural bird pest in Africa, indicating the role of human taste in developing agroecosystems fitting local environments.

Ligands
Ligands listed in BitterDB include quinine, parthenolide, denatonium, some non-sugar sweeteners including sucralose and stevioside, and several oligopeptides.

See also 
 Taste receptor

References

Further reading 

 
 
 
 
 
 
 
 
 

Human taste receptors